Girish Paranjpe is a venture capitalist.

History 
General Partner with Exfinity Venture Partners . Exfinity invests in deep tech start ups typically at early stage. 
Girish was also Operating Partner with a global Private Equity fund. 
Girish Paranjpe was the managing director of Bloom Energy International. He was the former Joint CEO of Wipro's IT Business and a Member of the Board of Wipro Limited. He jointly carried the overall responsibility for the strategy and operations of Wipro's IT Business.

Paranjpe joined Wipro in 1990 and held a broad range of leadership positions in critical portfolios across the Wipro Corporation during his tenure in Wipro since the early 1990s.

Paranjpe's direct responsibilities included the following business units: Financial Services, Communication, Media, Telecom and Technology vertical. Girish was also directly responsible for driving Consulting, Business Technology Services, Product Engineering Solutions and other functions under him are Global Delivery, CTO and CIO office & Operations.

Paranjpe had represented Wipro and the IT Industry in various public forums including the Prime Minister's Task Force on Information Technology, the NASSCOM, and leading global business schools. Paranjpe is a Fellow Member of the Institute of Chartered Accountants of India and the Institute of Cost and Works Accountants of India. He attended Sydenham College, Mumbai.

References

External links
 Forbes profile

Living people
Businesspeople in software
Indian accountants
Businesspeople from Bangalore
University of Mumbai alumni
Wipro
1959 births